Francesco Cantucci (died 26 Nov 1586) was a Roman Catholic prelate who served as Bishop of Loreto (1586).

Biography
On 23 Mar 1586, Francesco Cantucci was appointed during the papacy of Pope Sixtus V as Bishop of Loreto.
On 30 Mar 1586, he was consecrated bishop by Decio Azzolini (seniore), Bishop of Cervia. 
He served as Bishop of Loreto until his death on 26 Nov 1586.

See also 
Catholic Church in Italy

References

External links and additional sources
 (for Chronology of Bishops) 
 (for Chronology of Bishops)  

16th-century Italian Roman Catholic bishops
Bishops appointed by Pope Sixtus V
1586 deaths